Dan E. Moldea (born February 27, 1950) is an American best-selling author and investigative journalist who has reported on organized crime and political corruption since 1974.  He is the author of books about the rise and fall of Jimmy Hoffa, the contract killing of an Ohio businessman, the Mafia's penetration of Hollywood, its links to Ronald Reagan, and its influence on professional football, as well as works about the assassination of Senator Robert Kennedy, the O.J. Simpson murder case, the suicide of White House Deputy Counsel Vincent Foster, the Anthony Pellicano wiretapping scandal and prosecution, and corruption in higher education via the student-loan program and for-profit colleges.

The third edition of Confessions of a Guerrilla Writer, Moldea's memoir about his career as a crime reporter, was released in 2020, featuring new information about the Jimmy Hoffa murder case.

Moldea received his bachelor's degree in English and history from the University of Akron where he served as student-body president. He did his post-graduate work at Kent State University where he taught a course, "Racism and Poverty," in the Honors and Experimental College.

Moldea has lectured about "The Mafia in America" at colleges and universities throughout the country and has appeared on numerous national and local radio and television programs.  He was also featured in the 2004 film, The Hunting of the President.

Moldea is a former president of Washington Independent Writers. He is also a former national vice president of the National Writers Union.

In Moldea v New York Times, Moldea sued The New York Times, alleging a review of Interference: How Organized Crime Influences Professional Football was libelous. In 1994, after the lower court dismissed the case, the U.S. Court of Appeals for the D.C. Circuit reinstated it in an opinion known as Moldea I.  Followed by Moldea II, in what has been described as an unprecedented moment in American jurisprudence, the same appellate court snatched away Moldea’s momentary victory, suddenly reversing itself and ruling for the Times.  The U.S. Supreme Court allowed Moldea II to stand.

Since 1998, Moldea, a registered private investigator, has also worked as an independent investigative consultant, participating in, what he has described as, "a wide variety of breathtaking and mind-blowing capers."

Moldea describes himself as “Ahab” and has said that the Jimmy Hoffa murder case is his “white whale.”  He is widely regarded as one of the top experts on this crime.

He is of Romanian descent.

Works
The first chapters of Dan Moldea's books are available on his website.

 The Hoffa Wars: Teamsters, Rebels, Politicians, and the Mob (1978)
 1993 edition includes an introduction by Jonathan Kwitny.
 The Hunting of Cain:  A True Story of Money, Greed, and Fratricide (1983)
 Dark Victory: Ronald Reagan, MCA, and the Mob. New York: Open Media (1986)
 Interference: How Organized Crime Influences Professional Football New York: William Morrow & Co. (1989). .
 Killing of Robert F. Kennedy: An Investigation of Motive, Means, and Opportunity. New York: W. W. Norton & Co. (1995). . .
 Evidence Dismissed: The Inside Story of the Police Investigation of O.J. Simpson, with Tom Lange and Philip Vannatter (1997)
 A Washington Tragedy: How the Suicide of Vincent Foster Ignited a Political Firestorm (1998)
 Confessions of a Guerrilla Writer: Adventures in the Jungles of Crime, Politics, and Journalism (2013)
 Hollywood Confidential: A True Story of Wiretapping, Friendship, and Betrayal (2018)
 Money, Politics, and Corruption in U.S. Higher Education: The Stories of Whistleblowers (2020)

References

External links

Official website
Official blog
Dan Moldea at IMDb
Time: "D.C. Madam: Suicide Before Prison" and Moldea's response
Moldea's response to the Probe article. "The Curious Case of Dan Moldea."
Dan Moldea Investigative Journalism Collection, 1937-2008 at George Mason University
 Statement/Rebuttal-Moldea's COPA "Speech" (June 5, 1968), in the Philip H. Melanson research papers at the Claire T. Carney Library Archives and Special Collections, University of Massachusetts Dartmouth. 
Moldea v. New York Times
Chronology of events
May 3, 1994 decision
February 18, 1994 decision

American male journalists
American non-fiction writers
Non-fiction writers about organized crime in the United States
American people of Romanian descent
University of Akron alumni
Kent State University alumni
Writers from Akron, Ohio
Journalists from Washington, D.C.
1950 births
Living people
Journalists from Ohio